Lizard Creek is a tributary of the Elk River.  Their confluence is south of the city of Fernie, British Columbia near the base of Fernie Alpine Resort.  Lizard Creek drains a side valley of the Elk Valley called Cedar Valley, which is home to Island Lake Lodge.

See also
List of rivers of British Columbia

External links

Rivers of British Columbia
Elk Valley (British Columbia)
Rivers of the Canadian Rockies